Urawa Racecourse is a racecourse located in Saitama Prefecture, Japan.

Physical attributes
Urawa Racecourse is a dirt track, and the track is 1,200 meters in length. It is a left-handed course.

It has an admission fee of 100 yen.

Notable races

References

External links
 Official site 

Horse racing venues in Japan
Sports venues in Saitama (city)
Sports venues completed in 1947
1947 establishments in Japan